First National Bank, also known as the Adams & Mosier Real Estate Company, is a historic bank building located at Bolivar in Polk County, Missouri USA. It was built in 1907 and is a two-story, Classical Revival style buff brick building. It has a flat roof and a limestone foundation. It features Classical pilasters and a terra cotta cornice.

It was listed on the National Register of Historic Places in 2013.

References

Bank buildings on the National Register of Historic Places in Missouri
Neoclassical architecture in Missouri
Commercial buildings completed in 1907
Buildings and structures in Polk County, Missouri
National Register of Historic Places in Polk County, Missouri